Vinayak Korde is an Indian politician and member of the Bharatiya Janata Party. Korde was a member of the Maharashtra Legislative Assembly from the Achalpur constituency in Amravati district. He was Minister of State in the Narayan Rane ministry

References 

People from Amravati district
Bharatiya Janata Party politicians from Maharashtra
Maharashtra MLAs 1990–1995
Living people
21st-century Indian politicians
Maharashtra politicians
Year of birth missing (living people)
Maharashtra MLAs 1995–1999